Meulman is a surname. Notable people with the surname include:

 Jacqueline Meulman (born 1954), Dutch psychologist
 Niels Shoe Meulman (born 1967), Dutch visual artist, graffiti writer, graphic designer and art director

See also
 Meuleman (disambiguation page)